Charles L. Raison (born December 26, 1957) is an American psychiatrist and professor of psychiatry at the University of Wisconsin-Madison School of Medicine and Public Health as well as the Mary Sue and Mike Shannon Chair for Healthy Minds, Children & Families and Professor with the School of Human Ecology in Madison, Wisconsin.

Prior to this he was a professor in the Department of Psychiatry, College of Medicine, and the Barry and Janet Lang Professor of Integrative Mental Health at the Norton School of Family and Consumer Sciences, College of Agriculture and Life Sciences, at the University of Arizona. In addition to his academic positions, Dr. Raison serves as the founding Director of the Center for Compassion Studies in the College of Social and Behavioral Sciences at the University of Arizona and is the Director for Clinical and Translational Research for the Usona Institute, as well as the mental health expert for CNN.com.

Early life and education
Dr. Raison has an undergraduate degree in anthropology from Stanford University and a Master's degree in English literature from the University of Denver. He received his medical degree from Washington University School of Medicine and did his residency training in psychiatry at the Semel Institute for Neuroscience and Human Behavior at UCLA, where he later served as Director of Emergency Psychiatry Services.

Education
 Undergraduate: 1976–80 Stanford University, Stanford, CA, B.A. in Anthropology with honors and departmental distinction
 Graduate: 1982–85 University of Denver, Denver, CO, M.A. in English, with emphasis in creative writing
 PreMedical: 1985–86 Bryn Mawr College, Bryn Mawr, PA, Premedical Program, Post Baccalaureate
 Medical: 1987–91 Washington University School of Medicine, St. Louis, MO, M.D. degree

Post-graduate training
 1991–1992: Internship, Department of Psychiatry and Biobehavioral Sciences, UCLA Neuropsychiatric Institute and Hospital, Los Angeles, CA
 1992–1995: Psychiatric Residency, Department of Psychiatry and Biobehavioral Sciences, UCLA Neuropsychiatric Institute and Hospital, Los Angeles, CA
 1994–1995: Chief Resident, Adult Inpatient Services, Department of Psychiatry and Biobehavioral Sciences, UCLA Neuropsychiatric Institute and Hospital, Los Angeles, CA

Awards and honors
 2014: Principal Guest Scientist, 31st Midwest Symposium on Family Systems Theory and Therapy
 2014: Invited to give Bench-to-Bedside Keynote Address at the International Behavioral Neuroscience Society (IBNS) meeting
 2014: Raymond Pearl Award for “contributions to our understanding of evolutionary biocultural origins of mental health and illness”, Human Biology Association
 2013: NARSAD Independent Investigator Award (Brain & Behavior Research Society)
 2012: Chairman of the U.S. Psychiatric and Mental Health Congress
 2011: Champion of Hope Award from the Africa's Children's Fund
 2011: Distinguished Visiting Professorship, Brooke Army Medical Center, San Antonio, TX
 2011: Invited Member, Emory University Public Scholars Seminar
 2011: Chairman of the U.S. Psychiatric and Mental Health Congress
 2009: Senior Fellow of the Mind & Life Institute
 2009–10: Who's Who in Medicine and Healthcare
 2009: American Psychiatric Association Ninth Annual Research Colloquium for Junior Investigators, Invited Faculty Member
 2008: Semi-finalist presidential search for Naropa University, Boulder, CO
 2006: Emory College Seed Fund Award to Improve the Research Profile of the Arts and Sciences
 2006: Future Leaders in Psychiatry Travel Award
 2005: Emory College Seed Fund Award to Improve the Research Profile of the Arts and Sciences
 2005: Emory University Teaching Fund Award to develop interdisciplinary course entitled Phenomenology of Depression: Body, Mind and Culture
 2005: Who's Who in Medical Sciences Education
 2004: National Institutes of Health Extramural Loan Repayment Program Award
 2004: American Psychiatric Association Ninth Annual Research Colloquium for Junior Investigators, Invited Member
 2003: Emory University Medical Students' Teaching Award for Psychiatry
 2002: National Institutes of Health Extramural Loan Repayment Program Award
 2002: American Psychiatric Association Seventh Annual Research Colloquium for Junior Investigators, Invited Member
 2002–06: K23 Mentored Patient-Oriented Research Career Development Award, National Institute of Mental Health
 2001: Bristol Meyers Squibb Young Faculty Development Award
 2001: Emory University Psychiatry Senior Residents' Outstanding Educator Award
 2000: Emory University Teaching Fund Award for the development of an interdisciplinary course entitled Psychobiological Foundations of Personhood: Tibetan Buddhist and Western Perspectives
 2000: Emory Medical Care Foundation Research Award
 2000: Future Leaders in Psychiatry Travel Award
 1998: Balm Foundation Research Grant
 1993: American Psychoanalytic Association Fellow
 1991: Alpha Omega Alpha, Washington University chapter
 1991: Missouri State Medical Association Award
 1984: Colorado State Fellow, University of Denver

Publications

Scientific articles published in peer-reviewed journals
 
 
 
 
 
 
 
 
 
 
 
 
 
 Miller, A.H., Haroon, E., Raison, C.L., Felger, J.C. Cytokine Targets in the Brain: Impact on Neurotransmitters and Neurocircuits. Depression & Anxiety 2013; 30::297–306
 
 Hanusch, K., Janssen, C.H., Billheimer, D, Jenkins, I., Spurgeon, E., Lowry, C.A., Raison, C.L. Whole Body Hyperthermia (WBH) for the Treatment of Major Depression: Associations with Thermoregulatory Cooling. American Journal of Psychiatry 2013; 170: 802–804.

Review articles and clinical guidelines
 Raison C.L., Nemeroff C.B. "Cancer and depression: prevalence, diagnosis and treatment. 2000. Home Health Consultant 7; 9: 34–41.
 Raison, C.L. "Managing neuropsychiatric side effects of peginterferon. The Treatment Reporter. November 2002 Edition. Projects in Knowledge publications.
 Demetrashvili, M., Raison, C.L., Miller, A.H. Depression in at-risk populations. CNS news. July 2002: 9–12.
 
 Raison, C.L., Afdhal, N.H. Neuropsychiatric side effects associated with interferon-alfa plus ribavirin therapy: Recognition and risk factors. In: UpToDate, Rose, B.D. (Ed), UpToDate, Waltham, MA, 2006.
 Raison, C.L., Afdhal, N.H. Neuropsychiatric side effects associated with interferon-alfa plus ribavirin therapy: Treatment and prevention. In: UpToDate, Rose, B.D. (Ed), UpToDate, Waltham, MA, 2006.
 
 Maletic, V. & Raison, C.L. Immune disturbances in chronic pain: cause, consequence or both? Current Immunology Reviews, Accepted for publication
 
 Rook, G.A.W., Raison, C.L., Lowry, C.A. Major Depressive Disorder, Immunoregulation, Inflammation and Our Changing Microbial Environment. www.brainimmune.com. Friday, 4 November 2011.
 
 
 Rook, G.A.W., Raison, C.L., Lowry, C.A. Microbial “Old Friends”, immunoregulation and psychiatric disorders. Old Herborn University Seminar Monograph 2012
 Raison, C.L. & Miller, A.H. Do Cytokines Really Sing the Blues? Cerebrum: the online magazine that can change your mind. Dana Foundation, http://www.dana.org/news/cerebrum. August 2013

Books
 Maletic, V., Jain, R., Raison, C.L. 100 Questions and Answers about Pain. Jones and Bartlett Publishers, Inc. Sudbury, MA, 2010. 
 Draud, J.W., Jain, R., Maletic, V, Raison, C.L. Treating the Whole Patient: Exploring the Healing Potential of a Mind-Body Approach to Mental Health. CME LLC, 2011 
 Raison, C.L., Maletic, V. J. The New Mind-Body Science of Depression, W.W. Norton, New York, 2013

Book chapters
 Raison, C.L., Miller, A.H. Immune System and Central Nervous System Interactions. In: Kaplan & Sadock's Comprehensive Textbook of Psychiatry, 8th Edition. Eds: Sadock, B.J., Sadock, V.A. Philadelphia. Lippincott, Williams & Wilkins. 2005, pp. 137–161.
 Raison, C.L., Purselle, D.C., Capuron, L., Miller, A.H. Treatment of Depression in Medical Illness. In: Biology of Depression. Eds: Licinio, J. and Wong, M. 2005, pp. 253–278. 
 Raison, C.L., Giese-Davis, J., Miller, A.H., Spiegel, D. Depression in Cancer: Mechanisms, Consequences and Treatment. In: The Physician's Guide to Depression and Bipolar Disorders. Eds: Evans, D.L., Charney, D.S., Lewis, L. 2006, pp. 377–409. 
 Norris, E.R., Raison, C.L. Depression. In: Medical Management of the Surgical Patient: a Textbook of the Perioperative Patient. Eds: Lubin, M.F., Smith, R.B., Dobson, T.F., Spell, N., Walker, H.K. 2006, pp. 479–490. 
 Raison, C.L., Miller, A.H. Immune System and Central Nervous System Interactions. In: Kaplan & Sadock's Comprehensive Textbook of Psychiatry, 9th Edition. Eds: Sadock, B.J., Sadock, V.A. Philadelphia. Lippincott, Williams & Wilkins. 2009, pp. 175–198. 
 Owen-Smith, A.A., Raison, C.L. Complementary and Alternative Medicine. In: Clinical Manual of Prevention Principles in Mental Health Care. Ed: Compton, M. American Psychiatric Publishing, Inc, 2009, pp. 105–119. 
 Thompson, D.S., Raison, C.L., Jonas, C., Miller, A.H. Cancer and Depression: Phenomenology and Pathophysiology. In: Internal Medicine Care of Cancer Patients. Eds: Gagel, R.F., Escalante, C.P., and Yeung S-C. In press. 
 Nater, U., Heim, C.M., Raison, C.L. Chronic Fatigue Syndrome. In: vol: Neurobiology of Psychiatric Disorders. Eds: Schlaepfer, T.; series: Handbook of Clinical Neurology. Eds: Aminoff, M.J, Boller, F., Swabb, D.F., Elsevier, 2012. 
 Miller, A.H., Pace, T.W.W., Raison, C.L. Neuropsychiatric effects of IFN-alpha: relevance to depression. In: Understanding Depression: A Translational Approach. Eds: Pariante, C.M., Nesse, R.M., Nutt, D., Wolpert, L. Oxford University Press, Oxford, UK, 2009, pp. 223–237. 
 Nater, U., Raison, C.L., Miller, A.H., Reeves, W.C. Chronic Fatigue Syndrome. In: The Concise Corsini Encyclopedia of Psychology and Behavioral Science, 2nd Edition. Eds: Craighead WE and Nemeroff CB. John Wiley & Sons, Inc. Hoboken, NJ. 2004, pp. 177–180. 
 Burke, M.A., Raison, C.L., Miller, A.H. Depression in cancer: pathophysiology at the mind-body interface. In: Cancer Symptom Science: Measurements, Mechanisms, and Management. Eds: Cleeland, C.S., Fisch, M.J., Dunn, A.J. Cambridge University Press, Cambridge UK, 2010, pp. 75–85. 
 Pace, T.W.W., Raison, C.L., Miller, A.H. Role of inflammation in neuropsychiatric disorders. In: Inflammation, Life Style and Chronic Diseases: The Silent Link. Ed.: Aggarwal, B.B., 2011 
 Raison, C.L., Mascaro, J.S., Pace, T.W. Research on the Endocrinology of Compassion. In: Compassion: From Theory to Training to Neuroscience. A Multimedia Book. Ed.: Singer, T.A., 2012 
 Nater UM, Heim CM, Raison C, (2012). Chronic fatigue syndrome. In: Schlaepfer T, Nemeroff CB (Eds.), Neurobiology of Psychiatric Disorders. Handbook of Clinical Neurology, Vol 106. Elsevier, Amsterdam, pp. 573–587 
 Raison, C.L., Miller, A.H. The Role of Inflammation in Depression: Implications for Phenomenology, Pathophysiology and Treatment. In: Leonard, B., Halaris, A. (Eds.) Modern Trends in Pharmacopsychiatry, Vol. 28, 2013; Karger Medical and Scientific Publishers, Basel, Switzerland 
 Raison, C.L., Miller, A.H., Rook, G.A.W., Begay, T. "Role of Inflammation in Diseases of the Nervous System (Psychiatry)". In: Zigmond, M.J., Coyle, J.T., Rowland, L.P. (Eds.) Neurobiology of Brain Disorders. Elsevier, 2013 
 Dodson-Lavelle, B., Ozawa-de Silva, B., Raison, C.L., and Negi, L.T. Healing Through Compassion: Cognitively-Based Compassion Training for Foster Care Youth. In: Rozelle, D., Rome, D. (Eds.) Contemplative Methods in Trauma Treatment: Integrating Mindfulness and Other Approaches. Guilford Press, 2014 
 Shah, N. & Raison, C.L. Depression and the surgical patient. In: Lubin, M.F., Dodson, T.F., Winawer, N. (Eds.) Medical Management of the Surgical Patient: a Textbook of Perioperative Medicine, Cambridge University Press, 2013 
 Shah, N. & Raison, C.L. Psychological and emotional reactions to illness and surgery. In: Lubin, M.F., Dodson, T.F., Winawer, N. (Eds.) Medical Management of the Surgical Patient: a Textbook of Perioperative Medicine, Cambridge University Press, 2013 
 Rook, G.A.W., Lowry, C.A., Raison, C.L. Microbiota and the hygiene hypothesis of psychiatric disorders. In: Cryan, J.., Lyte, M. (Eds.) The Microbiota-Gut-Brain Axis in Health and Disease, Springer, 2013

Commentaries and editorials
 Miller, A.H., Raison, C.L. Cytokines, p. 38 MAP Kinase and the Pathophysiology of Depression. Neuropsychopharmacology 2006. 31: 2089–2090. 
 Raison, C.L. Buddhists Meet Mind Scientists in Conference on Meditation and Depression. Psychiatric Times, 25(3), May 2008
 Raison, C.L. An Evolutionary View on the Anti-Inflammatory Potential of Compassion. Annals of the New York Academy of Sciences Winter 2009:
 Raison, C.L., Maletic, V., Jain, R., Draud, J. From Chaos to Consilience Parts I–III. Psychiatric Times, May–August 2009
 Rook, G.A.W., Raison, C.L., Lowry, C.A. Childhood microbial experience, immunoregulation, inflammation and adult susceptibility to psychosocial stressors and depression in rich and poor countries. Evolution, Medicine, and Public Health 2012; Epub
 Raison, C.L. & Miller A.H. Malaise, melancholia and madness: The evolutionary legacy of an inflammatory bias

American psychiatrists
Living people
People from Dinuba, California
Stanford University alumni
University of Arizona faculty
University of Denver alumni
University of Wisconsin–Madison faculty
1957 births
Washington University School of Medicine alumni
Bryn Mawr College alumni